Steve Wiest (né John Stephen Wiest; born 1957) is an American trombonist, composer, arranger, big band director, music educator at the collegiate level, jazz clinician, author, and illustrator/cartoonist. From 1981 to 1985, he was a featured trombonist and arranger with the Maynard Ferguson Band. Wiest is in his  year as Associate Professor of Jazz Studies and Commercial Music at the University of Denver Lamont School of Music. He is the Coordinator of the 21st Century Music Initiative at the school. From 2007 to 2014, Wiest was Associate Professor of Music in Jazz Studies at the University of North Texas College of Music and, from March 2009 to August 2014, he was director of the One O'Clock Lab Band and coordinator of the Lab Band program. At North Texas, Wiest also taught conducting, trombone, and oversaw The U-Tubes — the College of Music's jazz trombone band. Wiest is a three-time Grammy nominee — individually in 2008 for Best instrumental Arrangement and in 2010 for Best Instrumental Composition, and collaboratively in 2010 for Best Large Jazz Ensemble Album, which he directed. As of 2013, Wiest has in excess of 58 arrangements and compositions to his credit, which include 10 original compositions from his current project (see 2013–2014 project, below).

Career 
After attending Hattiesburg High School, in Hattiesburg, Mississippi, Wiest completed a bachelor's degree in Jazz Studies at the University of Southern Mississippi, mentored by Raoul F. Jerome. After graduation, he joined the band of Maynard Ferguson as a featured trombonist and one of two arrangers, touring five to seven months a year from 1981 to 1985.

In 1985, Wiest began graduate school at the University of North Texas, earning a master's degree in Jazz Studies in 1988.  While there, he played lead trombone in the One O'Clock Lab Band, which toured Australia in 1986 and produced one live album, and four studio albums.  Three of his compositions and one arrangement were recorded on Lab '86, Lab '87, and Lab '88, and another composition was recorded on Lab '89, after he graduated.  As a grad student, Wiest directed the Nine O'Clock Lab Band (1985–1986), served as an arranging TA for Paris Rutherford (1986–1987), and directed the Three O'Clock Lab Band (1987–1988).  Wiest studied trombone with Vern L. Kagarice, DMA.  Independently, Wiest also studied trombone with Jay Friedman of the Chicago Symphony.

From 1988 to 1990, Wiest served as Assistant Director of Jazz Studies at the University of Texas at Arlington, where, among other things, he ran the UTA Improvisation Camp and directed the Small Jazz Group Program.

For 17 years, from 1990 to 2007, Wiest was the Director of Jazz Studies and Trombone Performance at University of Wisconsin–Whitewater, directing jazz ensembles, which included a standard modern big band and the university's premier jazz band: an Art Blakey-style small group called The Jazz Symposium.  He taught improvisation, music history, arranging, and classical trombone.  For a number of years, Wiest was a member of the Faculty Brass Quintet

Establishing a small group, rather than a big band, as the premier jazz ensemble and intensified advanced music laboratory was a pedagogical innovation of Wiest.  The Jazz Symposium produced two CDs, one featuring guest artist Ernie Watts.  Under the direction of Wiest, The Jazz Symposium performed at the North Sea Jazz Festival, the Montreux Jazz Festival, and King's College London

From 1994 to 1999, Wiest was a member of the Doc Severinsen Big Band.  In 2006, Wiest reunited with Maynard Ferguson for Ferguson's final series of concerts: 6 nights, 12 sold-out performances at The Blue Note, Greenwich Village.

From the fall of 2007 until August 2014, Wiest was at the University of North Texas as Assistant Professor of Jazz Composition and Jazz Trombone.  Wiest founded The U-Tubes, the College's trombone band.  In May 2009, Wiest became director of One O'Clock Lab Band and coordinator of the Lab Band Program, after having served as interim director since August 2008.

In 2014 Wiest joined the faculty at the University of Denver Lamont School of Music as Coordinator of the 21st Century Music Initiative. Since 2016 he has served as Co-Chair of Jazz Studies.

2013–2014 project 
In August 2013, Wiest, a sci-fi enthusiast, published a sci-fi novel, The Dover Stone: A Concerto for Folded Space.  Wiest explains that it is built on inter-connected vignettes or movements that comprise an epic tale of life from other worlds and our place in the cosmos.  The Term "folded space" is a theoretical speed of travel, faster than the speed of light, exceeding relativistic velocity by folding space, bringing far to near, reducing the long distances to a virtual zero. The tale is the impetus for ten compositions by Wiest, who describes the works as "programmatically informed" by the science fiction."  The fictional vignettes culminate to answer real-life physicist Enrico Fermi's famous question, "Where is everybody?", a reference to the wonderment of life elsewhere in the universe. The stories occur in periods from 1182 to 2457.

The Steve Wiest Eclectic Electric Band will record the compositions as one album titled, Concerto for Folded Space.  Wiest's compositional style ranges from straight ahead to jazz fusion, and sometimes pop-rock.  With this project, Wiest is experimenting with serialism, not in a strict sense, but many elements are generated from rows.

The musical portion is an ArtistShare project and is scheduled for release early 2014. The band members are Wiest (composer and trombonist), Stockton Helbing (drums, producer), Braylon Lacy (bass), Ryan Davidson (guitar), Noel Johnston (guitar), and Daniel Pardo (flute).  Guest artist are Bob Mintzer (tenor sax), Arlington Jones (né Arlington Julius Jones II) (piano), and James Pankow (trombone).

Essentially, ArtistShare is the record label and represents Wiest's foray into an alternative model for producing music.  ArtistShare is a fan-funded platform where artists provide content for patrons who subscribe to access levels of their choosing.  For example, on November 6, 2013, Wiest uploaded one in a series of "cool stuff", as he phrased it, to the Participant Zone of his ArtistShare Concerto for Folded Space site.  The "cool stuff" included a "programmatic" analysis and complete score for "The Flutes of Glastonbury", one of the ten compositions.

Other sci-fi inspired compositions

Other sci-fi-related works composed by Wiest include "Ice-Nine", a 2009 composition scored for big band, drawn from Kurt Vonnegut's novel, Cat's Cradle.  "New Cydoinia", a 2010 big-band arrangement, is a programmatic representation of all of the theories and stories surrounding the enigmatic area on Mars known as Cydonia.  "A Night in Pidruid", a 2006 composition scored for big band, is a programmatic and thematic development of characters and events in Robert Silverberg's Lord Valentine's Castle. "Blues From Space", a 1984 composition scored for big band, is a novelty tune about an alien who brings a philosophy of "Sing the Blues" to Earth.

Trombone manufacturer artist affiliations 
 Griego Mouthpieces — Wiest uses a Griego Artist Series trombone mouthpiece designed for him called the Griego-Wiest SW Model; the mouthpiece was commercially introduced April 2013
 Edwards Trombones — Wiest performs on an Edwards trombone, called the "Excalibur", which was exclusively designed for him by Elias Christan Griego of Edwards Instruments
 For more information on Edwards Trombones, see Getzen

Professional affiliations 
 1982 — Wiest became a member of ASCAP while composing and arranging for Maynard Ferguson; after a hiatus, he rejoined in 2009

Awards and recognition 
Academic
 1985–1986: Bill Stapleton Jazz Arranging Scholarship, University of North Texas College of Music
 1986–1987: M.E. "Gene" Hall Jazz Scholarship, University of North Texas College of Music
Professional
 January 2007: Wisconsin Arts Board Fellowship Award
 2010: ASCAP Plus Award, for creative contributions to American music during the year
 Grammy nominations:
2008: Best Instrumental Arrangement - for "Besame Mucho" from The One and Only
2010: Best Large Jazz Ensemble Album - for "Lab 2009" by One O'Clock Lab Band; Best Instrumental Composition - for "Ice-Nine"

Personal life 
Wiest lives in Chicago, Illinois with his fiancé Deborah Lamberty. He has three children from previous marriages - a daughter, Amber with Pam Sonmor Wintz, and two sons, Matthew and David with Carmen Smith. His father, John Thomas Wiest (1932–2006) was a trombonist and his mother, Wanda Jean Smith Stegall (1934-2016) was a special education teacher. Wiest has three siblings, Jeanne Stegall-Keene, Robert Wiest and Andrew Wiest, a professor of history at the University of Southern Mississippi.  His cousin, Nick Drozdoff, is a jazz trumpeter and music educator based in the Chicago area who also played with Maynard Ferguson in the 1980s.

Works

Selected sessionography and discography 

As leader

 Steve Wiest Big BandExcaliburRecorded in Chicago, August 5, 6 & 19, 2005Arabesque AJO180 (2006); 
 QuintetOut of the NewArabesque AJ0189 (2008) (sample video)
 Wiest (trombone); Stefan Karlsson (piano), Lynn Seaton (bass), Ed Soph (drums), and Fred Hamilton (né Frederick E. Hamilton) (guitar)
 The Steve Wiest Eclectic Electric BandConcerto for Folded SpaceArtistShare (scheduled release, early 2014)
 Stockton Helbing (drums, producer), Braylon Lacy (bass), Ryan Davidson (guitar), Noel Johnston (guitar), Daniel Pardo (flute)
 Featured guests: (i) Bob Mintzer (tenor sax), (ii) Arlington Jones (né Arlington Julius Jones II) (piano), (iii) James Pankow (trombone)

As director of the One O'Clock Lab Band
 Lab 2009 (CD); 
 Lab 2010 (CD); 
 Lab 2011 (CD & DVD); 
 Lab 2012 (CD & DVD); 
 Lab 2013 (CD); 
 Lab 2014 (CD)

As director of the U-Tubes
 The U-Tubes (2010);  samples

As director of The Jazz Symposium, UW-Whitewater
 Presenting the University of Wisconsin-Whitewater Jazz Symposium (1898) 
 Tracks 3 & 4 recorded live at the Montreux Jazz Festival, June 1996
 Track 7 recorded live at Irvin L. Young Auditorium, UW-Whitewater, February 1996
 Tracks 1 & 2, 5 & 6, 8 & 9 recorded in a studio 1996
 The best of the University of Wisconsin-Whitewater Jazz Symposium: 1996–1997 (1997) As trombonist and arranger with Maynard Ferguson 1982 Playboy Jazz Festival, Two volumes (video)
 Recorded live from The Hollywood Bowl, June 19 & 20, 1982
 RCA/Columbia Pictures Home Video (1984); 
 Maynard Ferguson, Stan Mark, Alan Wise, Hobby Freeman (trumpets); Steve Wiest, Cris Braymen (trombones); Nelson Hill (alto sax); Dan Jordan (tenor sax); Denis DiBlasio (bari sax, flute); Ron Pedley (keyboards); Matt Bissonette (bass); Gregg Bissonette (Drums)
 StormLive, Studio, Hollywood, California, June 23 & 24, 1982Palo Alto Records (1982); 
 Live From San FranciscoRecorded at the Great American Music Hall, San Francisco, May 27, 1983Palo Alto PA8077N (1983); 
 Kool Jazz Festival (1982)Recorded live for the Voice of America on July 3, 1982Saratoga Performing Arts Center, Saratoga Springs, New York; 
 The One And OnlyRecorded at Bennett Studios, Englewood, New Jersey, July 25–30, 2006Maynard Ferguson Trust (2007); 
 "Ain't No Sunshine When She's Gone", arranged by Wiest (audio sample)
 "Besame Mucho", arranged by Wiest, Grammy nominee (audio sample)As trombonist with the Frank Mantooth Jazz Orchestra Per-se-vereRecorded at Streeterville Studios, Chicago, October 5–7 & 29, 1989Optimism Records (1987), released by Sea Breeze; 
 Dangerous PrecedentRecorded at Streeterville Studios, Chicago, December 1991 to December 1992Sea Breeze (1993); 
 Sophisticated LadyRecorded January 23, April 24, December 13 & 14, 1994Sea Breeze (1995); As trombonist with other artists Arch Martin (né Archie Eugene Martin; 1931–2009)Jazz In Good Taste, Janelle (1993)Recorded in Kansas City, July 3 & 4, 1993
 Doc Severinsen and His Big BandSwingin' The BluesRecorded in Hollywood, February 4 & 5, 1999Azica Records & Naxos Digital (1999); 
 Ronnie Bedford & FriendsQuaDRUMvirateRecorded in Powell, Wyoming, October 4, 1999Progressive PCD-7123; As student trombonist and arranger with the One O'Clock Lab Band With Respect to Stan; 
 Recorded at Chelsea Sound Studios, New York, 1986
 Live in Australia – The 1986 Tour; (CD) 
 Recorded at the Festival Theatre, Adelaide, Australia, July 20, 1986
 Lab '86; 
 Recorded at the Dallas Sound Lab, Irving, Texas, May 1986
 Trombonist and composer of "The Miles Files" (1986) (audio from Lab '86)
 Lab '87; 
 Recorded at the Dallas Sound Lab, Irving, Texas, May 17 & 18, 1987
 Lab '88; 
 Recorded at the Dallas Sound Lab, Irving, Texas, May 14 & 15, 1988
 Trombonist and composer of "On the Edge" (1988) (audio from Lab '88, trombone solo by Wiest)As composer and trombonist with other artists One O'Clock Lab BandLab '89; Recorded at the Dallas Sound Lab, Irving, Texas, April 30 & May 1, 1989"With You", composed & arranged by Wiest (as an alumni)
 Dan Cavanagh's (né Daniel M. Cavanagh) Jazz Emporium Big BandPulse, OA2 Records 22048 (2008); 
 Recorded at Crystal Clear Sound Recording Studios, Dallas, Texas, March 2 & 3, 2008
 Stockton Helbing (né Stockton Thomas Helbing)For Nothing is Secret, Armored Records (2007); 
 Recorded in Dallas, Texas, December 13–15, 2006

 Selected compositions and arrangements Kendor Music, Inc., distributor "Art Appreciation"A tribute to Art BlakeyComposed & arranged by WiestCojarco Music, Inc. (1998); 
 "The Groove", (composed in the style of Art Blakey)Commissioned by the Illinois Music Educators Association1999 All State Jazz Ensemble (1999)
 "Thaditude"Commissioned by the Jazz Division of the Illinois Music Educators Association2009 Illinois All State Jazz EnsembleDoug Beach Music (2009) (ASCAP)UNC Jazz Press, Greeley, Colorado From One O'Clock Lab Band albums "The Miles Files"(audio from Lab '86) (live in 1997)  (1986)
 "Upside Downside"Composed by Mike SternArranged by Wiest(recorded on Lab '87) (1986); 

 Video sample, DR Big Band, 2007
 "Night Visions"Composed & arranged by Wiest(recorded on Lab '87) (1987); 
 "On the Edge" (1988)(audio from Lab '88), trombone solo by Wiest
 "With You"(recorded on Lab '89) (1989)
 From UNC Jazz Lab Band 1 albums "Second Thought", composed & arranged by Wiest (1998); 
 "Gotham City", commissioned by the University of Northern Colorado Lab Band I (1991)
 "Another Frame", arranged by Wiest (1998) (composed 1985); 
 From other projects "The Modal House of Hip Hop"Commissioned by Curt Hanrahan for the Milwaukee Youth Jazz Ensemble (2005)
 "Overview"Commissioned by Neil E. Hansen, Northwest College (1998)Walrus Music Publishing – trade name for Daniel Franz Beher, Pismo Beach, California (audio samples) "The Fulton Files", commissioned by Jesse Woolery for Denton High School, composed 2012
 "Don't Give Up Hope"Dedicated to the victims of the 2011 Tōhoku tsunami
 "It Happened On Cooper Street"Commissioned by Tim Ishii for the University of Texas at ArlingtonComposed by Wiest 2012 (ASCAP)
 From One O'Clock Lab Band albums "Spirals" (from Lab 2008)
 "Ice-Nine" (video from Lab 2009); (live from Birdland, March 10, 2009)
 "New Cydonia" (video from Lab 2010)
 "The Last Theme Song" (video from Lab 2011)
 "Denton Standard Time" (from Lab 2013)
 Written for other North Texas lab bands "Puddin' Time"Composed by Brad Leali (née) Bradford C LealiArranged 2010 by Wiest for the Three O'Clock Lab Band, Brad Leali, director
 "Wes' Side Story" (Wes Montgomery)Composed 2010 by Wiest for the Two O'Clock, Jay Saunders, director
 From the album, Excalibur "Excalibur", composed by Wiest 2006
 "The Silver Spin", composed by Wiest 2006
 "Cerulean 12", composed by Wiest 2006
 "The Once and Future Groove", composed by Wiest 2006
 "A Night In Pidruid", composed by Wiest 2006Maynard Ferguson Publishing and library Recorded and performed by the Maynard Ferguson Band "Besame MuchoComposed by Consuelo Velázquez & Sunny SkylarArranged by Wiest 2006(recorded on The One and Only)
 "Ain't No Sunshine When She's Gone"Composed by Bill WithersArranged by Wiest 2004(recorded on The One and Only)
 "I Love You"Composed by Cole PorterArranged by Wiest(recorded on Brass Attitude)
 "I'm Old Fashioned"Music by Jerome Kern, lyrics by Johnny MercerArranged by Wiest 2004(recorded on MF Horn VI)
 Performed by the Maynard Ferguson Band "Smile Again", composed & arranged by Wiest 1981
 "Brother to Brother", composed by Gino Vannelli, arranged by Wiest 1981
 "Gabriel's Gig Bag", composed & arranged by Wiest 1982
 "Return of the Chameleon", based on "Chameleon" by Herbie Hancock, adopted and arranged by Wiest 1983
 "Blues From Space", lyrics & music by Wiest (1984)
 "Tyrannosaurus", composed & arranged by Wiest 1984
 "Whiplash", composed & arranged by Wiest 1984
 "Compared to You", lyrics & music by Wiest (1985)
 "Portrait of Pamela J.", composed & arranged by Wiest (1985)
 "Balboa", composed & arranged by Wiest 1985
 "Megabyte", composed & arranged by Wiest 1999
 "Step Aside", composed & arranged by Wiest 1999Other publishers Recorded and performed by the Maynard Ferguson Band "Portuguese Love"Composed by Teena Marie BrockertArranged by Todd Cochran, adapted by Wiest 1982(from the "Live" performance by Maynard Ferguson), Jobete Publishing (1982); 
 Performed by the Maynard Ferguson Band "South 21st Shuffle"Arranged for Maynard Ferguson's band by WiestAdapted for full big band by Bob Lowden (né Robert W. Lowden; 1920–1998)Barnhouse (1983); 
 From One O'Clock Lab Band albums "The Fifth Shade" (audio sample from Lab 2012) at 4:00
 From the University of Wisconsin–Whitewater "Bu's Groove""Bu" is short for "Buhaina", Art Blakey's Muslim surnameComposed by Michael W. PlogArranged by Wiest 2000Unpublished "Hornets Nest" (1988)Composed as a possible theme song for the Charlotte Hornets basketball franchise

 Jazz festivals, concerts, master classes, and workshops 
In addition to Wiest's concert appearances at music festivals, clinics, and camps as director of the One O'Clock Lab Band, he has appeared as an artist and clinician with organizations and events that include:Collegiate Northwest Jazz Festival, Northwest College, Powell, Wyoming (1991, 1992, 1993, 1994, 1995, 1997, 1998)
 Coe College Jazz Summit (1998)
 The Elmhurst College Jazz Festival (2009)
 The University of Texas at Tyler (2007, 2010)
 The University of Southern Mississippi Symphony Orchestra (2011)
 Texas Tech Jazz Ensemble I
 Missouri State University Jazz Studies Ensemble, Springfield Jazz Festival (guest soloist; 2012)
 The Illinois State University Jazz Festival (2012)
 The Illinois Wesleyan University Jazz Festival (headliner; 2011, 2012)
 Sunbelt Jazz Festival, University of West Georgia
 Middle Tennessee Jazz Orchestra
 Rowan University Jazz Festival, Glassboro, New Jersey
 University of Northern Colorado Jazz Festival, GreeleyScholastic Annual South Dakota All-State Jazz Band Festival (1995, 1996, 1999)
 The Cudahy High School Band Cudahy, Wisconsin (1991 & 1995)
 Youth Jazz Ensemble of DuPage, Wheaton, Illinois (2005)
 Beloit Memorial High School, Beloit, Wisconsin (2006)
 Lincoln Senior High School, East St. Louis, Illinois (Miles Davis' alma mater)
 Badger Union High School Jazz Band, Geneva, Wisconsin
 Rolling Meadows High School Jazz Festival, Rolling Meadows, Illinois (2009)Regional, national, professional The Sioux Falls Jazz and Blues Festival (2006)
 The Greater St. Louis Jazz Festival (2007)
 The Jazz Knights, United States Military Academy Band (2007)
 Albuquerque Jazz Orchestra, 2008 NMIAJE Jazz All-State Conference (New Mexico Chapter if the International Association of Jazz Education)
 Army Blues, United States Army Band, Eastern Trombone Workshop (2011)As director of The Jazz Symposium, UW-Whitewater Montreux Jazz Festival
 North Sea Jazz FestivalAs director of the One O'Clock Lab Band Guinness Jazz Festival, Cork (city), Ireland
 Monterey Next Generation Jazz Festival
 Folsom Jazz Festival, Folsom, California

 Selected videography and podcasts Maynard Ferguson Playboy Jazz Festival, 1982, Volume IIRCA Columbia Pictures Home Video (1984); 
 "Don't Stop 'Til You Get Enough", by Michael JacksonArranged by Denis DiBlasio (Wiest solo at 1:44)
 2nd Annual Budweiser Newport Jazz Festival, Madarao, Japan (August 1983)
 Source: Japanese TV footage
 "Bebop Buffet, Part I," a tribute to Dizzy Gillespie, Charlie Parker, Thelonious Monk, Miles Davis, and Clifford BrownArranged by Denis DiBlasio
 "Gonna Fly Now" (theme from Rocky) (at 14:15)
 Personnel includes Maynard Ferguson – soloist (leader, trumpet), Steve Wiest (trombone), Tim Ries – soloist (alto sax), Daniel Jordan – soloist (tenor sax), Denis DiBlasio – soloist (bari sax, piccolo, scat singing), Gregg Bissonette (bass), Matt Bissonette (drums)
 Live at Disneyland (1983)"Bebop Buffet, Part I" (Wiest solo at 8:44)

 ZDF Jazz Club, studio broadcast with live audience, Berlin (1987)
 "Maynard's Theme", "Body & Soul," "Shuffle Monk"
 Berlin Jazz Festival, November 7, 1987, shared billing with the Chick Corea Acoustic Band, and the Gil Evans Orchestra — multinational broadcast, ZDF
 High Voltage personnel: Maynard Ferguson (trumpet, leader), Matt Wallace (tenor & alto sax), Michael Lufkin (bass), John Toomey (keyboards), Tom Bevan (guitar), David Tull (drums), Billy Hulting (percussion, vibes, marimba, midi-mallet, beat-boxer)
 Added personnel: Wayne Bergeron, Don Hahn (trumpets), Steve Wiest (reuniting while in grad school), Tim Ries (alto sax), Denis DiBlasio (bari sax, flute)
 "The Market Place" & "Jack Usage" (at 11:55)
 Maynard Ferguson Tribute Concert DVD (2007), Vol. 1 of 2; 
 Recorded live, September 20, 2006, Touhill Performing Arts Center, University of Missouri–St. Louis
 Personnel on Vol. 1 includes: Trumpets — Wayne Bergeron, Carl Fischer, Ernie Hammes, Stan Mark, Eric Miyashiro, Dennis Noday, Lew Soloff, Andrea Tofanelli, Walter White, Patrick Hession, Steve Schankman, Peter Olstad, Serafin Aguilar; saxes — Mike Dubaniewicz (alto), Matt Wallace (tenor), Denis DiBlasio (bari); trombones — Steve Wiest; piano — Christian Jacob, Chip Stevens, Jeff LashwayOne O'Clock Lab Band One O'Clock Alumni Lab Band, 50-Year Anniversary of the UNT Jazz Studies Program (1997)
 Director: Leon Breeden; saxes: Jim Riggs (lead), Dan Higgins, Lou Marini, Randy Lee, Bev Smith; trumpets: Gary Grant (lead), Jay Saunders, John Thomas, Clay Jenkins, Marv Stamm; trombones: Tom "Bones" Malone (lead), Steve Wiest, Chris Seiter, Jimmy Clark (bass), Bill Guthrie (bass); rhythm: Dan Haerle (piano), Ed Soph (drums), Jack Peterson (guitar), Tony Scherr (bass), Gene Glover (percussion)
 Solos: Jim Riggs (soprano), Clay Jenkins (trumpet), Randy Lee (tenor), Steve Wiest (trombone), Dan Higgins (alto), Chris Seiter (trombone), Ed Soph (drums), and Gary Grant (trumpet).
 "A Good Time Was Had By All," composed by Thad Jones

 Other works Cartoons and illustrationsArticlesLiner notesDigital media jazz advocacy'''

References

General references

Inline citations 

1957 births
Living people
American jazz trombonists
Male trombonists
American jazz composers
American male jazz composers
American music educators
American jazz educators
American cartoonists
American science fiction writers
University of Southern Mississippi alumni
University of North Texas College of Music alumni
University of Texas at Arlington faculty
University of Wisconsin–Whitewater faculty
University of North Texas College of Music faculty
Music of Denton, Texas
American male novelists
Novelists from Texas
Novelists from Wisconsin
Jazz musicians from Texas
21st-century trombonists
21st-century American male musicians